Gress, a hamlet on the Isle of Lewis in Scotland, is adjacent to the larger village of Back. Gress is within the parish of Stornoway. Between 1919 and 1921, Gress – along with nearby Coll and Tong – was the scene of several land raids.

Historical sites
The corn mill at Gress was built in the 19th century and used until the early 20th century. The two-storey building is in a state of ruin. There is a millstone still present.

Geography and geology
Gress is situated on the B895, between Stornoway and North Tolsta.

Nature

The moorland to the north of Gress is a breeding site for Arctic and great skua in the summer. The Iceland gull and the brent goose can be seen at Gress. The garden tiger moth has also been seen at Gress.

See also
 Lewis and Harris
 History of the Outer Hebrides

References

External links

 Visitor's guide for the Isle of Lewis
 Website of the Western Isles Council with links to other resources
 Disabled access to Lewis for residents and visitors
 
 A Guide to living in the Outer Hebrides, with most information pertaining to Lewis

Villages in the Isle of Lewis